Felicia nordenstamii is a flowering shrub in the family Asteraceae. It is found only in South Africa where it grows on limestone hills close to the sea on the southern coast. The lower parts of the stems are covered in grayish brown bark and the upper stem has many crowded, upwardly angled, alternate leaves with long hairs on the lower surfaces. Large flower heads form at the tips of the branches, each about 4 cm (1 in) across, with about thirty purplish blue ray florets surrounding many yellow disc florets.

Description
Where it has lost its leaves in lower part of the stem, it is covered with grayish brown bark. In the leaf-covered younger parts, the stem carries long hairs.

The large flower heads are set individually at the end of flower stalks of up to 1 cm (0.4 in) long, covered in dense long woolly hair. Approximately thirty female ray florets, have purplish blue straps of about 15 mm (0.6 in) long and 2 mm (0.08 in) wide, and are hairy in the upper part of the tubular section at its base. In the center of each corolla are five anthers merged into a tube, through which the style grows when the floret opens, hoovering up the pollen on its shaft. At the tip of both style branches is a narrowly triangular appendage. The cypselae of the ray florets are hairless, those of the disc florets short-haired.

Flowering occurs from September to October.

Differences with related species
Like Felicia echinata and F. westae, together with which F. nordenstamii constitutes the section Anhebecarpaea, it has firm, very regularly and densely set leaves on the younger parts of the stems, distinguishing them from all other Felicia species. The dense, long and woolly hairs, the long inner involucral bracts, and the narrowly obovate leaves set at an upward angle, set it apart from F. echinata (recurved narrowly ovate leaves) and F. westae (line- to lance-shaped leaves, pressed against the stem, hairless except for a fringe). It also has a likeness to Polyarrhena imbricata, which lacks the woolly hairs, large involucral bracts, and has white ray florets, tinged purple on the underside.

Taxonomy
As far as known, Felicia nordenstamii was first collected just east of Cape Agulhas by Terence Macleane Salter in 1934. The species is considered to be part of the section Anhebecarpaea.

The species was named in honor of Rune Bertil Nordenstam, a Swedish botanist that collected two specimens of this plant in 1962.

Distribution, habitat and ecology
Felicia nordenstamii is only known from limestone ridges just east of Cape Agulhas and near the Potberg.

Conservation
Felicia nordenstamii is considered near threatened. A substantial part of its habitat was lost over due to urban expansion around Struisbaai. It grows on several limestone ridges that have been identified for development. Its habitat is also degraded over its entire range because of invasive Acacia species.

References

External links
 Photos of Felicia nordenstamii on iNaturalist
 Line drawing of Felicia nordenstamii
 Distribution of Felicia nordenstamii

nordenstamii
Endemic flora of South Africa
Plants described in 1973